Elliot Marantette "Pete" Estes (January 7, 1916 – March 24, 1988) was an American automotive engineer and executive; he is best known as the fifteenth president of General Motors, from 1974 to 1981. He had previously been the Chief Engineer at Pontiac, President of Pontiac Division, and President of Chevrolet Division before becoming executive Vice President of General Motors in 1972.

Biography
He was born and grew up in Mendon, Michigan. He is descended on his mother's side from Patrick Marantette and Francis Mouton, early settlers in 1830s Mendon who were from Detroit and of French ancestry. After school Estes worked in a creamery in Constantine, Michigan.

At the suggestion of a cousin, he applied to the General Motors Institute (now Kettering University), an engineering institute started in Flint, Michigan, that had a cooperative study program combining work experience in the automotive industry. There he worked with Charles Kettering and later oversaw the successful introduction of the Oldsmobile Rocket V8 engine. Also he was credited with coining the name for the Chevrolet Camaro.

Following his tenure as an engineer at Oldsmobile, Estes was appointed Chief Engineer at Pontiac in 1956 by Semon "Bunkie" Knudsen. After becoming President of the Pontiac Division in 1961, he oversaw a dramatic increase in sales. He became President of the Chevrolet Division in 1965, executive Vice President of General Motors in 1972, and served as President of GM from 1974 to his retirement from the company in 1981.

Estes was inducted into the Automotive Hall of Fame in 1999.

After his retirement, Estes served as a director on the board of the Kellogg Company. He died of a heart attack at O'Hare Airport on March 24, 1988 while on his way to a board meeting.

References

External links 
A Memorial Tribute by Robert A. Frosch. Original page unavailable but captured from Internet Archive Wayback Machine
Profile at Kettering University (formerly GMI.) Original page unavailable but captured from Internet Archive Wayback Machine

1916 births
1988 deaths
People from Mendon, Michigan
American automotive engineers
General Motors former executives
Kettering University faculty
20th-century American engineers